Willis Jefferson Polk (October 3, 1867 – September 10, 1924) was an American architect, best known for his work in San Francisco, California. For ten years, he was the West Coast representative of D.H. Burnham & Company. In 1915, Polk oversaw the architectural committee for the Panama–Pacific International Exposition (PPIE).

Early life and education
Willis Polk was born on October 3, 1867 in Jacksonville, Illinois to architect builder Willis Webb Polk (1836-1906). The eldest of four children, in 1873 he moved with his family to Saint Louis, Missouri and again by 1881 to Hope, Arkansas. Willis Jr began his architectural training with his brother Daniel in his father's office.

In 1885, Polk's family moved again to Kansas City, where Willis Webb Polk, the father, serving as a founding member of the Kansas City Architects Association, was able to introduce his eldest son to Adriance Van Brunt, principal of the firm  Van Brunt & Howe to gain more experience as a draftsperson. Since Van Brunt & Howe of Boston had just established a branch office there, a few years later Willis Jr left Kansas City to seek his future studying under former Van Brunt associate William Robert Ware at Columbia University in New York City.

Career 
Willis Polk's early career included work with McKim, Mead & White, as well as Bernard Maybeck. In 1889, Polk joined the office of A. Page Brown in New York and moved with Brown's firm to San Francisco, subsequently taking over the Ferry Building project following Brown's death. Though his own career was inconsistent during these years, Polk became an active and outspoken advocate for the architectural profession and the standards of good design. During 1890-91 he published three issues of the Architectural News, conceived as an alternative to the conservative California Architect and Building News. In addition to Polk, John Galen Howard, Ernest Coxhead, and Bertram Goodhue were contributors to the News. In 1894, Polk led the Guild of Arts and Crafts, an organization of artists and architects, in an effort to create a Board of Public Works that would approve the design of all municipal projects. Polk also wrote a series of short critiques for The Wave, a San Francisco weekly review, between 1892 and 1899. At times harsh in his criticisms, Polk often alienated colleagues and former associates with his comments.

After much dissatisfaction with their logo, The Sierra Club adopted a design by Willis Polk, in Spring 1894. It was used as their logo with small changes until 1998.

He struggled to earn commissions, and in 1897 he declared bankruptcy. However, an opportunity presented itself in 1899. Francis Hamilton, of the local firm Percy & Hamilton, died, and George Washington Percy asked Polk to be his new partner. Polk was primarily in charge of design and employee management, while Percy focused on the business end. The partnership gave Polk a relief to his debt and the opportunity to work on large-scale commercial structures. The partnership designed five buildings, including One Lombard Street. Addison Mizner was one of his apprentices.

In 1901, Polk went on a tour of Europe and Chicago. In Chicago, he met prominent architect Daniel Burnham. From 1903 to 1913, Polk was the West Coast representative of D.H. Burnham & Company. Polk designed several of his most notable structures while associated with the firm, including the Merchants Exchange Building, the tallest building in San Francisco upon its completion in 1903. The 1906 San Francisco earthquake opened up numerous opportunities for Polk to design Burnham structures. He was a member of Mayor Eugene Schmitz's Committee of Fifty leaders who undertook ambitious plans to rebuild a world-class city. Polk was tasked with convincing city officials to adopt Burnham's 1905 Plan of San Francisco.

By 1910, Willis Polk was recognized as one of the most influential architects and urban planners in the city. Polk was again credited for designing the tallest building in San Francisco when his Hobart Building was completed in 1914. In 1915, Polk was appointed the chair of the architectural planning committee for the Panama–Pacific International Exposition. When the exposition concluded, Polk led the effort to preserve Bernard Maybeck's Palace of Fine Arts. One of Polk's most influential commissions came in 1916, when he was tasked to design the Hallidie Building. Its glass curtain facade was a precursor to modern skyscraper development. It has been argued to be the most important building in San Francisco. Polk was a versatile architect, with particular skill in combining classical styles with environmental harmony.  He was regarded for his elegant residential work, mainly in mansions and estates, in the Georgian Revival style for wealthy and prominent San Francisco residents.

After World War I, Polk's productivity declined. He oversaw the design of the War Memorial Opera House and Veterans Building, part of the planned Civic Center. In 1917, Polk designed but was not involved in the construction of the single family homes at 831, 837, 843 and 849 Mason Street in the exclusive area of Nob Hill in San Francisco at the intersection with California Street opposite the Mark Hopkins Hotel building. 849 Mason Street was redeveloped into four luxury apartments called Four at the Top in 1983 by the restaurateur and wine maker Pat Kuleto.

Legacy and death 
Polk died at home in San Mateo, California on September 10, 1924 at the age of 56. He is buried in Santa Clara Mission Cemetery in Santa Clara, California. After his death, his stepson Austin P. Moore ran his business Willis Polk & Co. into the 1930s.

Some of his papers are held at University of California, Berkeley, and scrapbooks are held at the California Historical Society and on microfilm at the Smithsonian Archives of American Art.

Notable Polk buildings

 Le Petit Trianon, on the grounds of De Anza College, Cupertino, California (1892)
 Valentine Rey house, 428 Golden Gate Avenue, Belvedere, California (1893)
 Bourn Mansion, 2550 Webster Street, Pacific Heights, San Francisco, California (1896) made for William Bowers Bourn II, which made clinker brick famous
 Robert Louis Stevenson Memorial, Portsmouth Square, San Francisco, with Bruce Porter (1897)
 Wyntoon, private estate in rural Siskiyou County, California, for attorney Charles Stetson Wheeler and later associated with the Hearst family, featured in 1899 in The American Architect and Building News (1899)
 First Church of Christ Scientist, 43 E. Saint James St., San Jose, California. A Neoclassical-style church with the floor in the shape of a Greek cross (1904)
 Merchants Exchange Building, San Francisco (1904; 1907 reconstruction with Julia Morgan)
 reconstruction of the James C. Flood Mansion as new home of the Pacific-Union Club, Nob Hill, San Francisco (1907)
 reconstruction of old Chronicle Building, now the Ritz-Carlton Club and Residences, San Francisco (1907)
 reconstruction of the Mills Building and Tower (1908; expansions 1914 and 1918)
 Sunol Water Temple, Sunol, California (1910) 
 Western Pacific Passenger Depot, Sacramento, California (1910)
 St. Mark's Episcopal Church (Berkeley, California) (1911)
  Pacific Gas & Electric Company, River Station B, 400 Jibboom Street, Sacramento, California (1912)
 Carolands Chateau, estate located in Hillsborough, California. Built by Willis, following the plans of French architect Ernest Sanson (1914–1916) 
 Hobart Building, 582–592 Market Street, San Francisco, California (1914)
 Filoli Estate, Woodside, California. (1915–1917)
 Hallidie Building, San Francisco (1917–1918) 
 reconstruction of Mission San Francisco de Asís (1917)
 St. Francis Yacht Club Clubhouse, San Francisco (c. 1924)
 Beach Chalet, Golden Gate Park, San Francisco (1925)
 Kezar Stadium, Golden Gate Park, San Francisco (1925)
 redesign of McCullagh–Jones House, Los Gatos, California (1931)
 Spring Valley Water Company, 425 Mason Street, San Francisco, California
 NE corner of 9th & Dolores, Carmel-by-the-Sea, California (1903 - for Polk's parents, Willis & Endemial Polk)
 86 Sea View, Piedmont, California (for James K. Moffitt)
 22 Roble Road, Berkeley, California (for Duncan McDuffie)
 Townhouses at 831-849 Mason Street, San Francisco, California

Further reading
Dwyer, Michael Middleton. Carolands. Redwood City, CA: San Mateo County Historical Association, 2006.

References

External links
Chronological listing of 65 selected extant architectural works in the Bay Area by Willis Polk (1890-1932)]
On the Edge of the World: Four Architects in San Francisco at the Turn of the Century
San Francisco: A cultural and literary history
Willis Jefferson Polk on Find A Grave

1867 births
1924 deaths
People from Jacksonville, Illinois
19th-century American architects
1906 San Francisco earthquake
Willis
Architecture in the San Francisco Bay Area
Addison Mizner
People from San Mateo, California
20th-century American architects
Architects from Illinois